Bambari (also Romanized as Bambarī) is a village in Behdasht Rural District, Kushk-e Nar District, Parsian County, Hormozgan Province, Iran. At the 2006 census, its population was 346, in 72 families.

References 

Populated places in Parsian County